Charaxes pondoensis, the Pondo emperor, is a butterfly of the family Nymphalidae. It is found in South Africa.

The wingspan is 45–55 mm in males and 48–60 mm in females.

Biology
The habitat is  coastal scarp forest.

pondoensis flies year-round, with peaks October/November and March to May.

Larvae feed on Milletia sutherlandi and Milletia grandis.

Notes on the biology of pondoensis are given by Pringle et al (1994)

Similar species
Charaxes ethalion  and   Charaxes karkloof  
C. pondoensis  differs from Charaxes ethalion and Charaxes karkloof  in the stronger contrast between the light and dark areas on the underside, especially in males; the underside is silvery grey, not brown as in the other two species. On the underside of the hindwing in area 4 there are two fine, black lines at the end of the cell – these meet on vein 4 immediately basad of the juncture between vein 4 and vein 3. In the nominate subspecies of Charaxes karkloof these two lines are always separated and meet vein 4 on either side of this juncture.

Taxonomy
Charaxes pondoensis is a member of the large species group Charaxes etheocles

References

Van Someren V.G.L 1967 Revisional notes on African Charaxes (Lepidoptera: Nymphalidae). Part IV. Bulletin of the British Museum (Natural History) (Entomology)277-316. 285 plate 1

External links
Charaxes pondoensis images at Consortium for the Barcode of Life

Butterflies described in 1967
pondoensis